The Clean Energy Ministerial (CEM) brings together a community of the world's largest and leading countries, companies, and international experts to achieve one mission—accelerate clean energy transitions. The CEM is an international clean energy leadership platform, a convening platform, an action platform, and an acceleration platform.

The current 29 members of the CEM account for 90% of the world’s clean power and 80% of global clean energy investments, and the vast majority of public R&D in clean energy technologies. This forum encourages partnerships and collaboration between the private sector, public sector, non-governmental organizations and brings together many leading international experts and energy organisations to collaborate and fast track the implementation of clean energy solutions. The forum operates through two interrelated features, an annual high-level ministerial policy dialogue of energy ministers, partners and other top global stakeholders; and year-round policy-targeted technical initiatives and high-visibility campaigns, the CEM work programme. The CEM work programme spans the clean energy spectrum (Clean Power, Clean Transport, Clean Buildings, Clean Industry, Cross-Sectoral, and Enabling Environment), with topics ranging from scaling up of electric mobility to appliance efficiency, and variable renewable integration to clean hydrogen deployment. Member participation in these initiatives and campaigns is voluntary and collaborative.

The CEM annual Ministerial policy dialogue is currently the only regular meeting of energy ministers focused exclusively on clean energy, with the hosting of the Ministerial meetings changing every year among the CEM member governments. There have been 13 Clean Energy Ministerial meetings as of 2022, with the 14th meeting scheduled to take place in July 2023 hosted by the Republic of India in Goa.

As of 2023, CEM members include Australia, Brazil, Canada, Chile, China, Denmark, European Commission, Finland, France, Germany, India, Indonesia, Italy, Japan, Korea, Mexico, Netherlands, New Zealand, Norway, Poland, Portugal, Russia, Saudi Arabia, South Africa, Spain, Sweden, United Arab Emirates, United Kingdom and United States.

CEM engagement is coordinated by an independent multilateral Secretariat housed at the International Energy Agency in Paris since 2016.

Organisation 

The CEM is a partnership of the world's leading economies working together to accelerate the implementation of clean energy technologies. It supports a broad range of clean energy policy and technology activities that together improve energy efficiency, expand clean energy supply, support energy systems transformation, and enhance human capacity. The CEM pairs political engagement among energy ministers at an annual Ministerial meeting with year-round technical initiatives and campaigns.

The annual Ministerial meetings are hosted by one or more CEM members, with the hosting role rotating annually among the membership based on voluntary expressions of interest. Members volunteering to host a Ministerial meeting also host a Preparatory Meeting for the preceding Ministerial Meeting. The meetings are thereafter organised by the host in coordination with the CEM's Steering Committee and Secretariat in alignment with the objectives of the CEM.

The year-round technical work of the CEM is bottom-up, voluntary, and collaborative. Member countries propose, work on, and share leadership of those CEM initiatives and campaigns that help them achieve their own national clean energy objectives. They also target active cooperation and partnerships with the private sector, international institutions, non-governmental organizations, and other stakeholders key to the deployment of innovative clean energy solutions. The underlying coordination support and analytical work of these initiatives and campaigns are undertaken by one or more operating agents appointed by the leading member governments shaping the work.

Steering Committee 
The CEM Steering Committee provides ongoing high-level strategic guidance to all aspects of the work of the CEM guiding activities in alignment of the CEM's overall mission. Steering Committee members serve for two-year renewable terms with staggered rotation. In undertaking its functions, the Steering Committee is co-chaired by the hosts of the immediate past Ministerial and the upcoming meeting host member. They are assisted in conducting the proceedings by the Secretariat. As of 31 November 2022, the Steering Committee is composed of the United States, Chile, Canada, China, Denmark, European Commission, India (current hosts), Brazil (upcoming hosts), United Kingdom, Mexico, and Saudi Arabia.

CEM Secretariat 
All CEM engagement, such as the organisation of annual ministerial meeting, support to Steering Committee and facilitation of the various initiatives and campaigns, is coordinated by an independent and multilateral Secretariat. At the time of the formation of the CEM in 2010, the Secretariat was housed within the US Department of Energy. In 2016 at the 7th Clean Energy Ministerial (CEM7) in San Francisco, CEM members "agreed to launch an enhanced effort called “CEM 2.0,” voting to increase the organization’s effectiveness by creating an international and multilateral secretariat to support CEM activities and move the Secretariat to the International Energy Agency". Since 2016, the Secretariat is hosted by the International Energy Agency (IEA) in Paris. Mr Christian Zinglersen assumed the role of the first head of the multilateral Secretariat supported by an international team in 2017. Mr Zinglersen was replaced by Mr Daniel Dorner as the Head of the CEM Secretariat in May 2020 who assumed the role of the second Head until December 2022.  The new Head of Secretariat is under recruitment.

Ministerial Meetings 

The CEM formally launched in 2010, and the United States hosted its first meeting (CEM1). The United Arab Emirates hosted CEM2 in 2011, the United Kingdom CEM3 in 2012, India CEM4 in 2013, Korea CEM5 in 2014, Mexico CEM6 in June 2015, the United States CEM7 in 2016, China CEM8 in 2017, followed by the European Commission, together with four Nordic countries (Sweden, Denmark, Norway, and Finland) hosting CEM9 in 2018, Canada the 10th Ministerial meeting (CEM10) in 2019, the Kingdom of Saudi Arabia CEM11 in 2020 and Chile hosting CEM12 in 2021. The United States hosted CEM13 in September 2022 in Pittsburgh, and will be followed by the Republic of India in July 2023.

Since 2016, the Mission Innovation, a technology R&D ministerial forum, is co-located back to back with the CEM meetings.

Initiatives of the Clean Energy Ministerial 
CEM Initiatives are the sustained collaborative efforts established and led by CEM Members to advance clean energy policy and technology. A minimum of three members are required to participate in the work of the Initiatives may take a wide variety of forms, based on the interests of Members. While CEM initiatives are led by CEM members, participation in initiatives is open to any country. Participation across all CEM initiatives are voluntary and commitments are non-binding for participating members. Initiatives primarily target governmental participation, but may include private sector participation.

The initiatives and campaigns of the CEM spam a wide range of topics, ranging from Power System Transformations to Clean Fuels such as Bioenergy and Hydrogen, and  energy demand sectors such as Industry, Transport and Buildings. Other enablers of clean energy transition such as clean energy finance, gender and issues of just transition also feature as CEM initiatives.

Other than being led and participated by different governments, the initiatives are coordinated by one or more organizations working in behalf of the governments as operating agents.

Current CEM works teams (i.e. Initiatives and Campaigns) are as follows:

Past initiatives and campaigns 
Past initiatives include the Combined Heat and Power (CHP) and Efficient District Heating and Cooling (DHC) Working Group, the Cool Roofs and Pavements Working Group, the Sectoral Working Group, the Bioenergy Working Group, Carbon Capture Use and Storage, and Sustainable Development of Hydropower. The Global Lighting and Energy Access Partnership (Global LEAP) which worked to facilitate access to affordable, clean, and quality-assured off-grid energy solutions. The Global Sustainable Cities Network (GSCN) which aimed to provide a platform for sustainable city initiatives throughout the world.

References

Energy and the environment